Legislative elections were held in Cisleithania in 1891 to elect the members of the eighth Imperial Council. They were the last elections in Cisleithania before the Badeni electoral reform, which drastically increased male suffrage. The German Liberal and Constitutional Party received 32.81% of the vote.

Electoral system
The elections were held according to the curia arrangement that was instituted in 1873 to complement the implementation of direct elections. Voters were classified according to their status and wealth into four curiae: 
Landowners
Trade and industry chambers
Large and medium farmers
Male city residents who were annually paying at least 5 guilders worth of taxes

Results

References

Cisleithania
Cisleithanian legislative elections
1891 in Austria-Hungary